Overcast! is the debut studio album by Minneapolis hip hop group Atmosphere, released on August 5, 1997 on Rhymesayers Entertainment. It is the only Atmosphere album to feature MC Spawn trading verses with Slug. Before the album's release, Spawn left the group due to conflicting motives.

The cover art is inspired by that of Judgment!, released in 1964 by jazz pianist Andrew Hill.

The album was remastered and re-released in 2017 with new artwork and bonus tracks.

Track listing
All songs produced by Ant.

2017 Remaster Bonus tracks

References

External links
 Rhymesayers Entertainment

Atmosphere (music group) albums
1997 debut albums
Rhymesayers Entertainment albums